The Bombardment of Tripoli in 1828 was a naval engagement fought between the navies of Tripoli and the Kingdom of the Two Sicilies. After the Pasha of Tripoli demanded money from the Kingdom of Two Sicillies in exchange for peace, the Neapolitan government sent a squadron to Tripoli to refuse the Tripolitan demands and attempt to coerce the Tripolitans away from war. Upon receiving the news that the Neapolitans refused the Tripolitans demands, the Pasha declared war on the Kingdom of the Two Sicillies.

As a result of the Pasha's declaration of war the Neapolitan squadron offshore began a blockade of the coast of Tripoli on 23 August 1828. The Neapolitans attempted to move into the harbor to bombard the city into submission but were forced into an engagement with the Tripolitan navy and repelled. The next few days saw further unsuccessful attempts by the Neapolitans at bombarding the city and engaging the Tripolitan fleet. Suffering losses and having made no progress against forcing Tripoli to abandon its demands for payment, the Neapolitan fleet withdrew on 29 August and sailed back to Naples. The war continued on uneventfully to October when through French mediation the Neapolitans finally acquiesced to the Tripolitan demands.

References

Tripoli
Conflicts in 1828
Naval battles involving Ottoman Tripolitania
History of Tripoli, Libya
1828 in Africa